Jung Han-min (born 8 January 2001) is a South Korean footballer currently playing as a forward for FC Seoul.

Club career
Jung Han-min joined FC Seoul in 2020.

On 1 August 2020, Jung debuted in K League 1

Career statistics

Club

References

External links
 

2001 births
Living people
South Korean footballers
South Korea youth international footballers
Association football forwards
K League 1 players
FC Seoul players
People from Uijeongbu
Sportspeople from Gyeonggi Province